Titheradge is a surname. Notable people with the surname include:

 Dion Titheradge (1889–1934), Australian-born actor and writer of revues, plays, and screenplays
 George Sutton Titheradge (1848–1916), English-Australian actor
 Madge Titheradge (1887–1961), Australian-born actress